Castillo de San Buenaventura is a defense tower located in Caleta de Fuste, a small town on the island of Fuerteventura, Canary Islands, Spain. It is also known as "Castillo de Caleta de Fuste", and the tower was recognized as historic-artistic monument in 1949.

History 
In the 18th century, the archipelago's commanding general at the time, Andrés Bonito y Pignatelli, ordered military engineer Claudio de L'Isle to build a tower to defend the area against pirates who operated from France, England and North Africa (Barbary pirates). Bonito y Pignatelli, who also built Torre de Tostón in the coastal town of El Cotillo, died in 1743.

Features 

Castillo de San Buenaventura included two iron cannons, a vault supported by a solid pillar in the center, as well as men employed as watchmen. The castle's rooftop included a bartizan, and a cistern to store water. Located near Caleta de Fuste's marina, visitors can access the tower via a stone staircase, which features a drawbridge with iron chains. Castillo de San Buenaventura is one of the town's prominent monuments.

Sources 
Guía de Fuerteventura
Government of the Canary Islands
ViajeJet travel blog
Fuerteventura travel guide

Buildings and structures in Fuerteventura
Castles in Canary Islands